The Lithuania women's national football team represents Lithuania in international women's football and is controlled by the Lithuanian Football Federation, the governing body for football in Lithuania.

Results and fixtures

 The following is a list of match results in the last 12 months, as well as any future matches that have been scheduled.

Legend

2022

2023

Coaching staff

Current coaching staff

Manager history
Rimantas Viktoravičius (????–)

Players

Current squad
 Caps and goals accurate up to and including 29 June 2022.

Recent call ups
 The following players have been called up to a Lithuania squad in the past 12 months.

Records

 Active players in bold, statistics correct as of 2020.

Most capped players

Top goalscorers

Competitive record

FIFA Women's World Cup

*Draws include knockout matches decided on penalty kicks.

Olympic Games

UEFA Women's Championship

*Draws include knockout matches decided on penalty kicks.

Women's Baltic Cup

Honours
Women's Baltic Cup
 Champions (5): 1996, 1998, 2007, 2015, 2021
Armenia Women's International Friendly Tournament
 Champions: 2021

See also

Sport in Lithuania
Football in Lithuania
Women's football in Lithuania
Lithuania women's national football team
Lithuania women's national football team results
List of Lithuania women's international footballers
Lithuania women's national under-20 football team
Lithuania women's national under-17 football team
Lithuania women's national futsal team

References

External links
Official website 
Lithuania at FIFA

 
European women's national association football teams
Nat